Raosaheb Antapurkar (12 August 1958 – 9 April 2021) was an Indian politician and a member of the 14th Maharashtra Legislative Assembly.

Biography
Antapurkar represented Deglur in the Maharashtra Legislative Assembly as a member of the Indian National Congress.

He died from COVID-19 on 9 April 2021, at 11 pm.

References

Maharashtra MLAs 2019–2024
Indian National Congress politicians
1958 births
2021 deaths
Deaths from the COVID-19 pandemic in India
People from Nanded district
Indian National Congress politicians from Maharashtra